Summerville is a town in the U.S. state of South Carolina situated mostly in Dorchester County, with small portions in Berkeley and Charleston counties. It is part of the Charleston-North Charleston-Summerville Metropolitan Statistical Area. Summerville's population at the 2020 census was 50,915.

Geography

The center of Summerville is in southeastern Dorchester County; the town extends northeast into Berkeley and Charleston counties. It is bordered to the east by the town of Lincolnville and to the southeast by the city of North Charleston. Summerville's town limits extend south as far as the Ashley River next to Old Fort Dorchester State Historical Park.

U.S. Route 78 passes near the center of Summerville, leading southeast  to downtown Charleston and northwest  to Interstate 95 at St. George. Interstate 26 leads through Summerville's northeast corner, with access from Exit 199, leading southeast to Charleston and northwest  to Columbia.

Demographics

2020 census

As of the 2020 United States census, there were 50,915 people, 19,374 households, and 13,130 families residing in the town.

2010 census
As of the census of 2010, there were 43,392 people residing in 16,181 households in the town. Summerville's population density is 2,404.7 inhabitants per square mile. Its racial makeup was 72.1% White, 21.4% Black or African American, 0.4% Native American, 1.5% Asian, 0.1% Pacific Islander, 1.6% from other races, and 2.9% from two or more races. Hispanic or Latino of any race were 5.0% of the population.

There were 16,181 households, of which 38.6% had children under the age of 18 living with them, 48.9% were married couples living together, 15.4% had a female householder with no husband present, and 31.0% were non-families. 25.3% of all households were made up of individuals, and 8.8% had someone living alone who was 65 years of age or older. The average household size was 2.55.

In the town, 27.0% of the population was under the age of 18, and 10.5% was 65 years of age or older. The median age was 34.7 years.

The median income for a household in the town was $54,677.  About 11.2% of the population was below the poverty line.  The median value of an owner-occupied home was $182,000.

History

The first settlement in Summerville began following the American Revolutionary War; it was called Pineland Village in 1785. Development in the area resulted from plantation owners who resided in the Charleston area and came to Summerville to escape seasonal insects and swamp fever.

Summerville became an official town on 17 December 1847. That year, the town passed a law against cutting down trees, the nation's first such law, and a $25 fine was issued to anyone who did so without permission. The town's official seal reads "Sacra Pinus Esto (The Pine is Sacred)."

In 1899, the International Congress of Physicians (or "Tuberculosis Congress") listed Summerville as one of the world's two best areas for treatment of and recovery from lung and throat disorders, due to its dry and sandy location and the many pine trees that release turpentine derivatives into the air. This notation is credited with aiding Summerville's commercial and residential development.

The former Summerville post office built in 1938 contains a mural, Train Time – Summerville, painted by Bernadine Custer in 1939. Federally commissioned murals were produced from 1934 to 1943 in the U.S. through the Section of Painting and Sculpture, later called the Section of Fine Arts, of the Treasury Department.

The Ashley River Road, Middleton Place, Colonial Dorchester State Historic Site, Old White Meeting House Ruins and Cemetery, and the Summerville Historic District are listed on the National Register of Historic Places.

Arts and culture
Starting in 1972, Summerville has supported the Summerville Family YMCA in hosting the annual Flowertown Festival to support health and wellness programs at the YMCA. It is South Carolina's largest arts and crafts festival. It is held during the last weekend of March or the first weekend of April in the Summerville Azalea Park. It often coincides with the annual Cooper River Bridge Run held in Charleston the same weekend. During the three days of the Flowertown Festival, Summerville sees about 200,000 visitors. Admission and parking is free to all who attend. No alcohol or pets are permitted at the festival. About 200 artists from around the country are invited and display their works for purchase. Area restaurants are featured in the festival's "Taste" section, where tickets can be purchased to sample their offerings. Children can enjoy the carnival in the Children's Jubilee/Kids Fest section.

In 1925, these flowers led Summerville's Chamber of Commerce to adopt the slogan "Flower Town in the Pines."

Summerville claims the title "The Birthplace of Sweet Tea." A recipe for sweet iced tea published in Texas native Marion Cabell's 1879 cookbook Housekeeping in Old Virginia has been cited as evidence against this claim.

Education
Public education in Summerville is administered by Dorchester School District Two, which operates Summerville High School. Summerville's 10,000-capacity Memorial Stadium is used for American football games.

Summerville has a public library, a branch of the Dorchester County Library.

Notable people

 Christopher Celiz, army ranger and Medal of Honor recipient
 Jenn Colella, comedian, actress, and singer
 Janet Cone, college athletic director at UNC Asheville
 Chuck Eidson, professional basketball player
 Sam Esmail, film and television producer known for Mr. Robot and Homecoming, resident of a few years
 Brett Gardner, professional baseball player
 A. J. Green, professional football player
 Charles Green, known as Angry Grandpa on YouTube
 Shanola Hampton, actress
 De'Angelo Henderson, professional football player
 Keith Jennings, professional football player
 Stanford Jennings, professional football player
 Milton Jennings, professional basketball player
 Annie Virginia McCracken, author
 John McKissick, high school football coach
 Fern Michaels, author

See also 
 List of municipalities in South Carolina

References

External links

 
 
 Summerville & Dorchester County's Official Tourism Site

 
Populated places established in 1847
Towns in South Carolina
Towns in Berkeley County, South Carolina
Towns in Charleston County, South Carolina
Towns in Dorchester County, South Carolina
Charleston–North Charleston–Summerville metropolitan area
1847 establishments in South Carolina